Cruelty to animals, also called animal abuse, animal neglect or animal cruelty, is the infliction by omission (neglect) or by commission by humans of suffering or harm upon non-human animals. More narrowly, it can be the causing of harm or suffering for specific achievements, such as killing animals for entertainment; cruelty to animals sometimes encompasses inflicting harm or suffering as an end in itself, referred to as zoosadism.

Divergent approaches to laws concerning animal cruelty occur in different jurisdictions throughout the world. For example, some laws govern methods of killing animals for food, clothing, or other products, and other laws concern the keeping of animals for entertainment, education, research, or pets. There are several conceptual approaches to the issue of cruelty to animals.

Even though some practices, like animal fighting, are widely acknowledged as cruel, not all people and nations have the same definition of what constitutes animal cruelty. Many would claim that docking a piglet's tail without an anesthetic constitutes cruelty.  Others would respond that it is a routine technique for meat production to prevent harm later in the pig's life. Additionally, laws governing animal cruelty vary from nation to nation. While it is routine practice in the United States, docking a piglet's tail as part of regular practice is prohibited in the European Union (EU).

It may be said that there is nothing inherently wrong with using animals for human purposes, such as food, clothing, entertainment, and research, but that it should be done in a way that minimizes unnecessary pain and suffering, sometimes referred to as "humane" treatment. In contrast, some have argued that the definition of 'unnecessary' stated above varies widely and could include virtually all current use of animals.

Utilitarian advocates argue from the position of costs and benefits and vary in their conclusions as to the allowable treatment of animals. Some utilitarians argue for a weaker approach which is closer to the animal welfare position, whereas others argue for a position that is similar to animal rights. Animal rights theorists criticize these positions, arguing that the words "unnecessary" and "humane" are subject to widely differing interpretations and that animals have basic rights. They say that most animal use itself is unnecessary and a cause of suffering, so the only way to ensure protection for animals is to end their status as property and to ensure that they are never viewed as a substance or as non-living things.

Definition and viewpoints 

Throughout history, some individuals, like Leonardo da Vinci for example, who once purchased caged birds in order to set them free, were concerned about cruelty to animals. His notebooks also record his anger with the fact that humans used their dominance to raise animals for slaughter. According to contemporary philosopher Nigel Warburton, for most of human history the dominant view has been that animals are there for humans to do with as they see fit.

Several religious traditions, especially those originating in India, have promoted animal welfare as an important or fundamental concept, even to the point of promoting veganism. Examples include Buddhism, Jainism, and some forms of Hinduism.

René Descartes believed that non-humans are automata—complex machines with no soul, mind, or reason. In Cartesian dualism, consciousness was unique to human among all other animals and linked to physical matter by divine grace. However, close analysis shows that many human features such as complex sign usage, tool use, and self-consciousness can be found in some animals.

Charles Darwin, by presenting the theory of evolution, revolutionized the way that humans viewed their relationship with other species. Darwin believed that not only did human beings have a direct kinship with other animals, but the latter had social, mental and moral lives too. Later, in The Descent of Man (1871), he wrote: "There is no fundamental difference between man and the higher mammals in their mental faculties."

Modern philosophers and intellectuals, such as Peter Singer and Tom Regan, have argued that animals' ability to feel pain as humans do makes their well-being worthy of equal consideration. There are many precursors of this train of thought. Jeremy Bentham, the founder of utilitarianism, famously wrote in his An Introduction to the Principles of Morals and Legislation (1789):

These arguments have prompted some to suggest that animals' well-being should enter a social welfare function directly, not just indirectly via its effect only on human well-being. Many countries have now formally recognized animal sentience and animal suffering, and have passed anti-cruelty legislation in response.

Forms
Animal cruelty can be broken down into two main categories: active and passive. Passive cruelty is typified by cases of neglect, in which the cruelty is a lack of action rather than the action itself. Oftentimes passive animal cruelty is accidental, born of ignorance. In many cases of neglect in which an investigator believes that the cruelty occurred out of ignorance, the investigator may attempt to educate the pet owner, then revisit the situation. In more severe cases, exigent circumstances may require that the animal be removed for veterinary care.

Industrial animal farming

Farm animals are generally produced in large, industrial facilities that house thousands of animals at high densities; these are sometimes called factory farms. The industrial nature of these facilities means that many routine procedures or animal husbandry practices impinge on the welfare of the animals and could be considered cruelty, with Henry Stephen Salt claiming in 1899 that "it is impossible to transport and slaughter vast numbers of large and highly-sensitive animals humanely".
It has been suggested the number of animals hunted, kept as companions, used in laboratories, reared for the fur industry, raced, and used in zoos and circuses, is insignificant compared to farm animals, and therefore the "animal welfare issue" is numerically reducible to the "farm animal welfare issue". Similarly, it has been suggested by campaign groups that chickens, cows, pigs, and other farm animals are among the most numerous animals subjected to cruelty. For example, because male chickens do not lay eggs, newly hatched males are culled using macerators or grinders. Worldwide meat overconsumption is another factor that contributes to the miserable situation of farm animals.
Many undercover investigators have exposed the animal cruelty taking place inside the factory farming industry and there is evidence to show that consumers provided with accurate information about the process of meat production and the abuse that accompanies it has led to changes in their attitudes.

The American Veterinary Medical Association accepts maceration subject to certain conditions, but recommends alternative methods of culling as more humane. Egg-laying hens are then transferred to "battery cages" where they are kept in high densities. Matheny and Leahy attribute osteoporosis in hens to this caging method. Broiler chickens suffer similar situations, in which they are fed steroids to grow at a super-fast speed, so fast that their bones, heart, and lungs often cannot keep up. Broiler chickens under six weeks old suffer painful crippling due to fast growth rates, whilst one in a hundred of these very young birds dies of heart failure.

To reduce aggression in overcrowded conditions, shortly after birth piglets are castrated, their tails are amputated, and their teeth are clipped, and are earmarked. Calves are sometimes raised in veal crates, which are small stalls that immobilize calves during their growth, reducing costs and preventing muscle development, making the resulting meat a pale color, preferred by consumers.

In the United States, animal cruelty such as soring, which is illegal, sometimes occurs on farms and ranches, as does lawful but cruel treatment such as livestock branding. Since ag-gag laws prohibit video or photographic documentation of farm activities, these practices have been documented by secret photography taken by whistleblowers or undercover operatives from such organizations as Mercy for Animals and the Humane Society of the United States posing as employees. Agricultural organizations such as the American Farm Bureau Federation have successfully advocated for laws that tightly restrict secret photography or concealing information from farm employers.

Welfare concerns of farm animals 

The following are lists of invasive procedures that cause pain, routinely performed on farm animals, and housing conditions that routinely cause animal welfare concerns. In one survey of United States homeowners, 68% of respondents said they consider the price of meat a more important issue.

Fur industry 

Animal welfare activists suggest a total ban on fur production due to the suffering inflicted on animals, especially minks. It has been suggested that fur production is immoral as fur clothes are luxury items. Minks are solitary and territorial animals; however, in fur farms, they are raised in cages and skinned after being killed either by breaking their necks or using lethal gas.

Alleged link to human violence and psychological disorders
There are studies providing evidence of a link between animal cruelty and violence towards humans. A 2009 study found that slaughterhouse employment increases total arrest rates, arrests for violent crimes, arrests for rape, and arrests for other sex offenses in comparison with other industries. A large national survey by the Norwegian Centre for Violence and Traumatic Stress Studies found a "substantial overlap between companion animal abuse and child abuse" and that cruelty to animals "most frequently co-occurred with psychological abuse and less severe forms of physical child abuse."

A history of torturing pets and small animals, a behavior known as zoosadism, is considered one of the signs of certain psychopathologies, including antisocial personality disorder, also known as a psychopathic personality disorder. According to The New York Times, "[the FBI has found that a history of cruelty to animals is one of the traits that regularly appears in its computer records of serial rapists and murderers, and the standard diagnostic and treatment manual for psychiatric and emotional disorders lists cruelty to animals a diagnostic criterion for conduct disorders." "A survey of psychiatric patients who had repeatedly tortured dogs and cats found all of them had high levels of aggression toward people as well, including one patient who had murdered a young boy." Robert K. Ressler, an agent with the Federal Bureau of Investigation's behavioral sciences unit, studied serial killers and noted, "Murderers like this (Jeffrey Dahmer) very often start by killing and torturing animals as kids."

Acts of intentional animal cruelty or non-accidental injury may be indicators of serious psychological problems. According to the American Humane Association, 13% of intentional animal abuse cases involve domestic violence. As many as 71% of pet-owning women seeking shelter at safe houses have reported that their partner had threatened and/or hurt or killed one or more of their pets; 32% of these women reported that one or more of their children had also hurt or killed pets. Battered women report that they are prevented from leaving their abusers because they fear what will happen to the animals in their absence. Animal abuse is sometimes used as a form of intimidation in domestic disputes.

Cruelty to animals is one of the three components of the Macdonald triad, behavior considered to be one of the signs of violent antisocial behavior in children and adolescents. According to the studies used to form this model, cruelty to animals is a common (but not universal) behavior in children and adolescents who grow up to become serial killers and other violent criminals. It has also been found that children who are cruel to animals have often witnessed or been victims of abuse themselves. In two separate studies cited by the Humane Society of the United States, roughly one-third of families suffering from domestic abuse indicated that at least one child had hurt or killed a pet.

Cultural rituals
Many times, when Asiatic elephants are captured in Thailand, handlers use a technique known as the training crush, in which "handlers use sleep-deprivation, hunger, and thirst to 'break' the elephants' spirit and make them submissive to their owners"; moreover, handlers drive nails into the elephants' ears and feet.

The practice of cruelty to animals for divination purposes is found in ancient cultures, and some modern religions such as Santeria continue to do animal sacrifices for the healing and other rituals. Taghairm was performed by ancient Scots to summon devils.

Entertainment

Television and filmmaking

Animal cruelty has long been an issue in filmmaking industry, with even some big-budget Hollywood films receiving criticism for allegedly harmful—and sometimes lethal—treatment of animals during production. Court decisions have addressed films that harm animals such as videos that in part depict dog fighting.

The American Humane Association (AHA) has been associated with monitoring American film-making since the release of the film Jesse James (1939), in which a horse was pushed off a plank and drowned in a body of water after having fallen 40 feet into it. Initially, monitoring of animal cruelty was a partnership between the AHA and the Motion Picture Producers and Distributors of America (also called the Hays office) through the Motion Picture Production Code. Provisions in the code discouraged "apparent cruelty to children and animals", and because the Hays Office had the power to enforce this clause, the AHA often had access to sets to assess adherence to it. However, because the AHA's Hollywood office depended on the Hays Office for the right to monitor sets, the closure of the Hays Office in 1966 corresponded with an increase in animal cruelty on movie sets.

By 1977, a three-year contract was in place between the Screen Actors Guild (SAG) and the American Federation of Television and Radio Artists which specified that the AHA should be "consulted in the use of animals 'when appropriate'", but the contract did not provide a structure for what "appropriate" meant, and had no enforcement powers. This contract expired in 1980.

One of the most infamous examples of animal cruelty in the film was Michael Cimino's flop Heaven's Gate (1980), in which numerous animals were brutalized and even killed during production. Cimino allegedly killed chickens and bled horses from the neck to gather samples of their blood to smear on actors for Heaven's Gate, and also allegedly had a horse blown up with dynamite while shooting a battle sequence, the shot of which made it into the film. This film played a large part in renewed scrutiny of animal cruelty in films and led to renewed official on-set jurisdiction to monitor the treatment of animals by the AHA in 1980.

After the release of the film Reds (1981), the star and director of the picture, Warren Beatty apologized for his Spanish film crew's use of tripwires on horses while filming a battle scene, when Beatty was not present. Tripwires were used against horses when Rambo III (1988) and The 13th Warrior (1999) were being filmed. An water buffalo was sliced nearly in half during the production of Apocalypse Now (1979), while a donkey was bled to death for dramatic effect for the Danish film Manderlay (2005), in a scene later deleted from the film.

There is a case of cruelty to animals in the South Korean film The Isle (2000), according to its director Kim Ki-Duk. In the film, a real frog is skinned alive while fish are mutilated. Seven animals were killed for the camera in the controversial Italian film Cannibal Holocaust (1980). The images in the film include the slow and graphic beheading and ripping apart of a turtle, a monkey being beheaded and its brains being consumed by natives and a spider being chopped apart. Cannibal Holocaust was only one film in a collective of similarly themed movies (cannibal films) that featured unstaged animal cruelty. Their influences were rooted in the films of Mondo filmmakers, which sometimes contained similar content. In several countries, Cannibal Holocaust was banned or allowed for release with most of the animal cruelty edited out.

More recently, the video-sharing site YouTube has been criticized for hosting thousands of videos of real-life animal cruelty, especially the feeding of one animal to another for entertainment and spectacle. Although some of these videos have been flagged as inappropriate by users, YouTube has generally declined to remove them, unlike videos that include copyright infringement.

The SAG has contracted with the AHA for monitoring animal use during filming or while on the set. Compliance with this arrangement is voluntary and only applies to films made in the United States. Films monitored by the American Humane Association may bear one of their end-credit messages. Many productions, including those made in the United States, do not advise AHA or SAG of animal use in films, so there is no oversight.

Some other animal welfare organizations worldwide, such as the Animal Anti-Cruelty League in South Africa, have also monitored the use of animals in the film.

Circuses
The use of animals in the circus has been controversial since animal welfare groups have documented instances of animal cruelty during the training of performing animals. Animal abuse in circuses has been documented such as keeping them in small enclosures, lack of veterinary care, abusive training methods, and lack of oversight by regulating bodies. Animal trainers have argued that some criticism is not based on fact, including beliefs that shouting makes the animals believe the trainer is going to hurt them, that caging is cruel and common, and that the use of whips, chains or training harms animals.

Bolivia has enacted what animal rights activists called the world's first ban on all animals in circuses.

Animal fighting

Bullfighting is criticized by animal rights or animal welfare activists, referring to it as a cruel or barbaric blood sport in which the bull suffers severe stress and slow, torturous death. Several activist groups undertake anti-bullfighting actions in Spain and other countries. In Spanish, opposition to bullfighting is referred to as agriturismo.

The Bulletpoint Bullfight warns that bullfighting is "not for the squeamish", advising spectators to "be prepared for blood". It details prolonged and profuse bleeding caused by horse-mounted lancers, the charging by the bull of a blindfolded, armored horse who is "sometimes doped up, and unaware of the proximity of the bull", the placing of barbed darts by banderilleros, followed by the matador's fatal sword thrust. It stresses that these procedures are a normal part of bullfighting and that death is rarely instantaneous. It further warns those attending bullfights to "be prepared to witness various failed attempts at killing the animal before it lies down."

The "Toro Jubilo" or Toro embolado in Soria, Medinaceli, Spain, is a festival associated with animal cruelty. During this festival, balls of pitch are attached to a bull's horns and set on fire. The bull is then released into the streets and will run around in pain, often smashing into walls in an attempt to douse the fire as spectators attempt to dodge the animal. The pitch balls can burn for hours, and they burn the bull's horns, body, and eyes. The animal rights group PACMA has described the fiesta as "a clear example of animal mistreatment".

Dog fighting is a sport that turns dogs against one another in a ring or a pit for gambling or the entertainment of the spectators.

Rattlesnake round-ups
Rattlesnake round-ups, also known as rattlesnake rodeos, are annual events common in the rural Midwest and Southern United States, where the primary attractions are captured wild rattlesnakes which are sold, displayed, killed for food or animal products (such as snakeskin) or released back into the wild. The largest rattlesnake round-up in the United States is held in Sweetwater, Texas. Held every year since 1958, the event currently attracts approximately 30,000 visitors per year and in 2006 each annual round-up was said to result in the capture of 1% of the state's rattlesnake population.
Rattlesnake round-ups became a concern by animal welfare groups and conservationists due to claims of animal cruelty. In response, some round-ups impose catch-size restrictions or releasing captured snakes back into the wild.

Warfare
Military animals are creatures that have been employed by humankind for use in warfare. They are a specific application of working animals. Examples include horses, dogs and dolphins. Only recently has the involvement of animals in war been questioned, and practices such as using animals for fighting, as living bombs or for military testing purposes (such as during the Bikini atomic experiments) may now be criticized for being cruel.

Princess Anne, Princess Royal, the patron of the British Animals in War Memorial, stated that animals adapt to what humans want them to do, but that they will not do things that they do not want to, even with training. Animal participation in the human conflict was commemorated in the United Kingdom in 2004 with the erection of the Animals in War Memorial in Hyde Park, London.

In 2008 a video of a US Marine throwing a puppy over a cliff during the Iraq conflict was popularised as an internet phenomenon and attracted widespread criticism of the soldier's actions for being an act of cruelty.

Unnecessary scientific experiments or demonstrations

Under all three of the conceptual approaches to animal cruelty discussed above, performing unnecessary experiments or demonstrations upon animals that cause them substantial pain or distress may be viewed as cruelty. Due to changes in ethical standards, this type of cruelty tends to be less common today than it used to be in the past. For example, schoolroom demonstrations of oxygen depletion routinely suffocated birds by placing them under a glass cover, and animals were suffocated in the Cave of Dogs to demonstrate the density and toxicity of carbon dioxide to curious travelers on the Grand Tour.

No pet policies and abandonment

Many apartment complexes and rental homes institute no pet policies. No pet policies are a leading cause of animal abandonment, which is considered a crime in many jurisdictions. In many cases, abandoned pets have to be euthanized due to the strain they put on animal shelters and rescue groups. Abandoned animals often become feral or contribute to feral populations. In particular, feral dogs can pose a serious threat to pets, children, and livestock.

In Ontario, Canada, no pet policies are outlawed under the Ontario Landlord and Tenant Act and are considered invalid even when a tenant signs a lease that includes a no pets clause. Similar legislation has also been considered in Manitoba.

Hunting

Hunting is largely a recreational activity causing death and injury to a significant number of animals. In poaching the animal is killed and valuable parts such as tusks or bones are collected. Canned hunting refers to the practice of bringing exotic animals as trophies to private land for hunting. Despite being cruel to animals, hunting is practiced in thousands of private properties around the world and is considered a profitable business.

Laws by country

Many jurisdictions around the world have enacted statutes which forbid cruelty to some animals but these vary by country and in some cases by the use or practice.

Africa

Egypt

Egyptian law states that anyone who inhumanely beats or intentionally kills any domesticated animal may be jailed or fined. The Egyptian Society for the Prevention of Cruelty to Animals was established over a hundred years ago and was instrumental in promoting a 1997 ban on bullfighting in Egypt.

In ancient Egyptian law, the killers of cats or dogs were executed.

Nigeria 
Animal cruelty in Nigeria is prohibited under Section 495 of the Criminal Code (1990). These include, according to 495(1)(a), cruelly beating, kicking, over-loading, infuriating, or terrifying an animal, or allowing this to happen as the owner. Section 495(1)(b) defines failure to act as the willful or unreasonable doing or omission of any act that causes unnecessary suffering (or as the owner, permitting an act that causes unnecessary suffering). This section also prohibits transporting animals in a way that causes unnecessary suffering (c), administering poison (d), performing operations without due care (e), and actions related to animal fighting (f).

South Africa
The Animal Protection Act No 71 of 1962 in South Africa covers "farm animals, domestic animals and birds, and wild animals, birds, and reptiles that are in captivity or under the control of humans."

The Act contains a detailed list of prohibited acts of cruelty including overloading, causing unnecessary suffering due to confinement, chaining or tethering, abandonment, unnecessarily denying food or water, keeping in a dirty or parasitic condition, or failing to provide veterinary assistance. There is also a general provision prohibiting wanton, unreasonable, or negligible commission or omission of acts resulting in unnecessary suffering. The Department of Agriculture, Forestry and Fisheries for 2013/14 to 2016/17 mentions updating animal protection legislation.

The NSPCA is the largest and oldest animal welfare organisation in South Africa that enforces 90% of all animal cruelty cases in the country by means of enforcing the Animals Protection Act.

South Sudan
The Criminal Code of South Sudan has laws against maltreatment of animals. The laws read:

196. Ill-treatment of Domestic Animal.
Whoever cruelly beats, tortures or otherwise willfully ill-treats any tame, domestic or wild animal, which has previously been deprived of its liberty, or arranges, promotes or organizes fights between cocks, rams, bulls or other domestic animals or encourages such acts, commits an offence, and upon conviction, shall be sentenced to imprisonment for a term not exceeding two months or with a fine.
197. Riding and Neglect of Animal.
Whoever wantonly rides, overdrives or overloads any animal or intentionally drugs or employs any animal, which by reason of age, sickness, wounds or infirmity is not in a condition to work, or neglects any animal in such a manner as to cause it unnecessary suffering, commits an offence, and upon conviction, shall be sentenced to imprisonment for a term not exceeding one month or with a fine or with both.

Americas

Argentina
In Argentina, National Law 14346 sanctions from 15 days to one year in prison for those who mistreat or inflict acts of cruelty on animals.

Brazil 

Brazil is a high-volume animal producer, slaughtering around 30.8 land-based animals per person per year, compared to a global average of 10.1. The country's dependency on farmed animals is relatively high, with around 8 farmed animals per person, double the global average of 4.1.
A 1998 law prohibits the abuse of domestic and wild animals. It imposes more serious penalties for cruelty than the 1934 decree, with a sentence of 3 months to a year plus a fine, with the penalty increased by one-sixth to one-third of the animal is killed.

Canada

In Canada, it is an offence under the Criminal Code to intentionally cause unnecessary pain, suffering, or injury to an animal. Poisoning animals is specifically prohibited. It is also an offence to threaten to harm an animal belonging to someone else. Most provinces and territories also have animal protection legislation. However, it is not explicitly illegal in Canadian law to kill a dog or cat for consumption.

The Animal Legal Defense Fund releases an annual report ranking the animal protection laws of every province and territory based on their relative strength and general comprehensiveness. In 2014, the strongest four jurisdictions were Manitoba, British Columbia, Ontario, and Nova Scotia. The weakest four were Saskatchewan, Northwest Territories, Quebec, and Nunavut.

Chile
Law 20380 established sanctions including fines, from 2 to 30 Mensual Tributary Units, and prison, from 541 days to 3 years, for those involved in acts of animal cruelty. Also, it facilitates animal care through school education and establishes a Bioethics Committee to define policies related to experiments with animals.

Colombia

In Colombia, there is little control over cruel behaviors against animals, and the government has proposed that bullfighting be declared a "Cultural Heritage"; other activities like cockfighting are given the same legal treatment.

Costa Rica 

In 2017, after many years of legal wrangling, Costa Rica passed their Animal Welfare Law. It includes prison sentences of three months to one year for harming or killing a domesticated animal or for conducting animal fights. There are monetary fines for those who mistreat, neglect, or abandon animals, for breeding or training animals for fighting, or violating regulations on animal experimentation. The law does not cover agricultural practices, aquaculture, zootechnical or veterinary activities, killing of animals for consumption, for sanitary or scientific reasons, or reproductive control. Wild animals are covered under the Wild Life Act.

The bill had stalled its motion through the legislature until an injured toucan was found which had lost the top half of its beak. News and images of the injured bird, now named Grecia, raised enough contributions to create a 3D printed prosthesis for her, and helped spur the bill's progress.

Mexico
The current policy of Mexico, in civil law, condemns physical harm to animals as property damage to the owners of the abused animal, considering the animals as owned property.

In criminal law, the situation is different. In December 2012, the Legislative Assembly of the Federal District reformed the existing Penal Code of Mexico City, establishing abuse and cruelty to animals as criminal offenses, provided the animals are not deemed to be plagues or pests. Abandoned animals are not considered to be plagues. A subsequent reform was entered into force on 31 January 2013, by a decree published in the Official Gazette of the Federal District. The law provides penalties of six months to two years imprisonment, and a fine of 50 to 100 days at minimum wage, to persons who cause obvious injury to an animal, and the penalty is increased by one-half of those injuries endanger its life. The penalty rises to two to four years of prison, and a fine of 200 to 400 days at minimum wage, if the person intentionally causes the death of an animal.

This law is considered to extend throughout the rest of the 31 constituent states of the country. In addition, The Law of Animal Protection of the Federal District is wide-ranging, based on banning "unnecessary suffering". Similar laws now exist in most states.

United States

The primary federal law relating to animal care and conditions in the US is the Animal Welfare Act of 1966, amended in 1970, 1976, 1985, 1990, 2002, and 2007. It is the only Federal law in the United States that regulates the treatment of animals in research, exhibition, transport, and by dealers. Other laws, policies, and guidelines may include additional species coverage or specifications for animal care and use, but all refer to the Animal Welfare Act as the minimum acceptable standard.

The Animal Legal Defense Fund releases an annual report ranking the animal protection laws of every state based on their relative strength and general comprehensiveness. In a 2013's report, the top five states for their strong anti-cruelty laws were Illinois, Maine, Michigan, Oregon, and California. The five states with the weakest animal cruelty laws in 2013 were Kentucky, Iowa, South Dakota, New Mexico, and Wyoming.

In Massachusetts and New York, agents of humane societies and associations may be appointed as special officers to enforce statutes outlawing animal cruelty.

In 2004, a Florida legislator proposed a ban on "cruelty to bovines", stating: "A person who, for practice, entertainment, or sport, intentionally fells, trips, or otherwise causes a cow to fall or lose its balance using roping, lassoing, dragging, or otherwise touching the tail of the cow commits a misdemeanor of the first degree." The proposal did not become law.

In the United States, ear cropping, tail docking, rodeo sports, and other acts are legal and sometimes condoned. Penalties for cruelty can be minimal if pursued. Currently, 46 of the 50 states have enacted felony penalties for certain forms of animal abuse. However, in most jurisdictions, animal cruelty is most commonly charged as a misdemeanor offense. In one recent California case, a felony conviction for animal cruelty could theoretically net a 25-year to a life sentence due to their three-strikes law, which increases sentences based on prior felony convictions.

In 2003, West Hollywood, California, passed an ordinance banning declawing of house cats. In 2007, Norfolk, Virginia passed legislation only allowing the procedure for medical reasons. However, most jurisdictions allow the procedure.

In April 2013, Texas Federal Court Judge Sim Lake ruled that the Animal Crush Video Prohibition Act of 2010, which criminalized the recording, sale, and transport of videos depicting animal cruelty as obscenity, violates the First Amendment. Judge Lake noted that obscenity tests require an explicitly sexual depiction, which the criminalized videos lack. This follows the precedent set by United States v. Stevens, which additionally held that restrictions on the possession of animal cruelty videos were unconstitutional.

In November 2019, then-U.S. President Donald Trump signed the Preventing Animal Cruelty and Torture Act, making certain intentional acts of cruelty to animals federal crimes carrying penalties of up to seven years in prison. The Act expanded upon the 2010 Animal Crush Video Prohibition Act signed by President Barack Obama that banned the creation and distribution of videos that showed animals being crushed, burned, drowned, suffocated, impaled, or subjected to other forms of torture. The underlying acts, which were not included in the 2010 bill, are part of the PACT Act and are now felony offenses. The bill was unanimously passed in both the House and Senate.

State welfare laws
Several states have enacted or considered laws in support of humane farming.
 On 5 November 2002, Florida voters passed Amendment 10 by a margin of 55%, amending the Florida Constitution to ban the confinement of pregnant pigs in gestation crates.
 On 14 January 2004, the bill AB-732 died in the California Assembly's Agriculture Committee. The bill would have banned gestation and veal crates, eventually being amended to include only veal crates. On 9 May 2007, the bill AB-594 was withdrawn from the California State Assembly. The bill had been effectively killed in the Assembly Agriculture Committee, by replacing the contents of the bill with language concerning tobacco cessation coverage under Medi-Cal. AB-594 was very similar to the current language of Proposition 2.
 On 7 November 2006, Arizona voters passed Proposition 204 with 62% support. The measure prohibits the confinement of calves in veal crates and breeding sows in gestation crates.
 On 28 June 2007, Oregon Governor Ted Kulongoski signed a measure into law prohibiting the confinement of pigs in gestation crates (SB 694, 74th Leg. Assembly, Regular Session).
In January 2008, Nebraska State Senate bill LB 1148, to ban the use of gestation crates for pig farmers, was withdrawn within five days amidst controversy.
 On 14 May 2008, Colorado Governor Bill Ritter signed into law a bill, SB 201, that phases out gestation crates and veal crates.

Venezuela
Venezuela published a "Law for Protection of Domestic Fauna free and in captivity" in 2010, defining responsibilities and sanctions regarding animal care and ownership. Animal cruelty acts are fined, but are not a cause for imprisonment. The law also forbids the possession, breeding, and reproduction of pit bull dogs, among similar breeds that are alleged to be aggressive and dangerous. It elicited reactions from dog owners, who said that aggressiveness in dogs is determined more by treatment by the owner than by the breed itself.

Asia

Israel
Israel banned the sale of fur to the fashion industry in June 2021, being the first country in the world to do so.

China

As of the year 2006, there were no laws in China governing acts of cruelty to animals. There are no government-supported charitable organizations like the RSPCA, which monitors the cases of animal cruelty. All kinds of animal abuses, such as to fish, tigers, and bears, are to be reported to law enforcement and animal welfare.

In the absence of a unified law against animal mistreatment, the World Animal Protection notes that some legislation protecting the welfare of animals exists in certain contexts, especially ones used in research and zoos.

In September 2009, legislation was drafted to address deliberate cruelty to animals in China. If passed, the legislation would offer some protection to pets, captive wildlife, and animals used in laboratories, as well as regulate how farm animals are raised, transported, and slaughtered.

In 2008, the People's Republic of China was in the process of making changes to its stray-dog population laws in the capital city, Beijing. Mr. Zheng Gang who is the director of the Internal and Judicial Committee which comes under the Beijing Municipal People's Congress (BMPC), supported the draft of the Beijing Municipal Regulation on Dogs from the local government. The law would replace the Beijing Municipal Regulation on Dog Ownership, introduced in 1989. The extant regulation talked of "strictly" limiting dog ownership and controlling the number of dogs in the city. The proposed draft focused instead on "strict management and combining restrictions with management."

Hong Kong
As of 2010, Hong Kong has supplemented or replaced the laws against cruelty with a positive approach using laws that specify how animals should be treated.
The government department primarily responsible for animal welfare in Hong Kong is the Agriculture, Fisheries, and Conservation Department (AFCD).

Laws enforced by the AFCD include these:
 the Prevention of Cruelty to Animals Ordinance (also enforced by the police)
 the Public Health (Animals and Birds) Ordinance (including regulations for licences imposed on livestock keepers and animal traders and a Code of Standards for Licensed Animal Traders)
 the Dogs and Cats Ordinance
 the Pounds Ordinance
 the Rabies Ordinance
 the Wild Animals Protection Ordinance
In addition, the Food and Environmental Hygiene Department (FEHD) does the following:
 enforces the Public Health and Municipal Services Ordinance, which includes regulations for slaughterhouses and wet markets
 publishes a Code of Practice for the Welfare of Food Animals (which describes their transport)
 publishes Operational Guidelines for the Welfare of Food Animals at Slaughterhouses
The Department of Health does the following:
 enforces the Animals (Control of Experiments) Ordinance.
 publishes a Code of Practice for the Care and Use of Animals for Experimental Purposes

As of 2006, Hong Kong has a law titled "Prevention of Cruelty to Animals Ordinance", with maximum 3-year imprisonment and fines of HKD$200,000.

India

The Prevention of Cruelty to Animals Act, 1960 was amended in the year 1982.
According to the newly amended Indian animal welfare act, 2011 cruelty to animals is an offense and is punishable with a fine which shall not be less than ten thousand Rupees, which may extend to twenty-five thousand rupees or with imprisonment up to two years or both in the case of a first offense. In the case of a second or subsequent offense, with a fine which shall not be less than fifty thousand Rupees, but may extend to one lakh Rupees and with imprisonment with a term which shall not be less than one year but may extend to three years. This amendment is currently awaiting ratification from the Government of India. The 1962 Act is the one that is practiced as of now. The maximum penalty under the 1962 Act is Rs. 50 (under $1).
Many organizations, including ones such as the local SPCA, PF, A, and Fosterdopt are actively involved in assisting the general population in reporting cruelty cases to the police and helping bring the perpetrator to justice. Due to this, much change has been observed in the subcontinent. In 2022, A provision of a maximum of five-year imprisonment with a minimum 75 thousand rupees fine for killing an animal has been made. The draft Bill also suggests five freedoms of animals including freedom from thirst, hunger and malnutrition and from fear and distress, under Section 3A.

Japan

In Japan, the 1973 Welfare and Management of Animals Act (amended in 1999 and 2005) stipulates that "no person shall kill, injure, or inflict cruelty to animals without a due course", and in particular, criminalizes cruelty to all mammals, birds, and reptiles possessed by persons; as well as cattle, horses, goats, sheep, pigs, dogs, cats, pigeons, domestic rabbits, chickens, and domestic ducks regardless of whether they are in captivity.
 Killing or injuring without due reason: up to one year's imprisonment with labour or a fine of up to one million yen
 Cruelty such as causing debilitation by discontinuing feeding or watering without due reason: a fine of up to five hundred thousand yen
 Abandonment: a fine of up to five hundred thousand yen

Separate national and local ordinances exist about ensuring the health and safety of animals handled by pet shops and other businesses.

Animal experiments are regulated by the 2000 Law for the Humane Treatment and Management of Animals, which was amended in 2006. This law requires those using animals to follow the principles outlined in the 3Rs and use as few animals as possible, and cause minimal distress and suffering. Regulation is at a local level based on national guidelines, but there are no governmental inspections of institutions and no reporting requirement for the numbers of animals used.

Malaysia 

Cruelty towards animals protected under the Animal Welfare Act (2015) is punishable by a fine of 20–100,000 ringgit and/or imprisonment of up to three years. Cruelty towards animals protected under the Wildlife Conservation Act (2010) is punishable by a fine of 5–50,000 ringgit and/or up-to one year imprisonment.
Under the AA, a person commits an offense of animal cruelty if they "cruelly beats, kicks, ill-treats, overrides, overdrives, overloads, tortures, infuriates or terrifies any animal.

Saudi Arabia
Veterinarian Lana Dunn and several Saudi nationals report that there are no laws to protect animals from cruelty since the term is not well-defined within the Saudi legal system. They point to a lack of a governing body to supervise conditions for animals, particularly in pet stores and in the exotic animal trade with East Africa.

South Korea 

South Korea's animal welfare laws are weak by international standards.
South Korea's animal protection law states that anyone who abuses or is cruel to animals may be sentenced to a maximum of three years in prison or fined 30 million won ($25,494), but the standards to decide penalties have been low as the animals are treated as objects under the current legal system, Choung said.

Taiwan
The Taiwanese Animal Protection Act was passed in 1998, imposing fines of up to NT$250,000 for cruelty. Criminal penalties for animal cruelty were enacted in 2009
, including a maximum of one-year imprisonment.

Thailand 

Thailand introduced its first animal welfare law in 2014. The Cruelty Prevention and Welfare of Animal Act, B.E. 2557 (2014) came into being on 27 December 2014.

Europe

European Union
The European Union Council Directive 1999/74/EC is a directive passed by the European Union on the minimum standards for keeping egg laying hens which effectively bans conventional battery cages. The directive, passed in 1999, banned conventional battery cages in the EU from 1 January 2012 after a 13-year phase-out.

It is also illegal in many parts of Europe to declaw a cat.

France
In France, cruelty to animals is punishable by imprisonment of two years and a financial penalty (€30,000).

Germany

In Germany, killing animals or causing significant pain (or prolonged or repeated pain) to them is punishable by imprisonment of up to three years or a financial penalty.
If the animal is of foreign origin, the act may also be punishable as criminal damage.

Italy
Acts of cruelty against animals can be punished with imprisonment, for a minimum of three months up to a maximum of three years, and with a fine ranging from a minimum of 3,000 Euros to a maximum of 160,000 Euros, as for the law n°189/2004.

Ireland
The Animal Health and Welfare Act 2013 came into force in 2014, improving animal protection. The maximum penalty is up to €250,000 and up to five years in prison. Sentences of up to three years have been imposed in several cases.

Portugal
Since 1 October 2014, violence against animals has been a crime in Portugal. Legislation published in the Diário da República on 29 August criminalizes the mistreatment of animals and indicates that "those who, without reasonable cause, inflict pain, suffering, or any other hardship to a companion animal abuse" are to be subject to imprisonment of up to one year. If such acts result in the "death of the animal", the "deprivation of an important organ or member", or "serious and permanent impairment of its capacity of locomotion", those responsible will be punished by imprisonment up to two years.

As for pets, the new law provides that "whoever, having the duty to store, monitor or pet watch, abandons them, thereby putting in danger their food and the provision of care owed" faces up to six months imprisonment.

Sweden
In Sweden cruelty to animals is punishable by financial penalty and prison for up to two years. The owner will lose the right to own animals and the animals will be removed from the owner.

Switzerland
The Swiss animal protection laws are among the strictest in the world, comprehensively regulating the treatment of animals including the size of rabbit cages, and the amount of exercise that must be provided to dogs.

In the canton of Zurich an animal lawyer, Antoine Goetschel, is employed by the canton government to represent the interests of animals in animal cruelty cases.

Turkey
Under Turkey's Animal Protection Law No. 5199, cruelty to animals is considered a criminal offence, punishable by up to four years in prison. In July 2021, Turkey banned the opening of circuses which use animals, and dolphinariums. Existing facilities will cease operations in ten years. HAYTAP, the Animal Rights Federation in Turkey, used to believe that the previous law did not contain a strong enough punishment for animal abusers.

United Kingdom

In the United Kingdom, cruelty to animals is a criminal offence for which one may be jailed for up to 6 months.

On 18 August 1911, the House of Commons introduced the Protection of Animals Act 1911 (c.27) following lobbying by the Royal Society for the Prevention of Cruelty to Animals (RSPCA). The maximum punishment was six months of "hard labour" with a fine of 25 pounds.

In the Metropolitan Police Act 1839 "fighting or baiting Lions, Bears, Badgers, Cocks, Dogs, or other Animals" was prohibited in London, with a penalty of up to one-month imprisonment, with possible hard labour, or up to five pounds. The law laid numerous restrictions on how, when, and where animals could be driven, wagons unloaded, etc. It also prohibited owners from letting mad dogs run loose and gave police the right to destroy any dog suspected of being rabid or any dog bitten by a suspected rabid dog. The same law prohibited the use of dogs for drawing carts.

Up until then, dogs were used for delivering milk, bread, fish, meat, fruit, vegetables, animal food (the cat's-meat man), and other items for sale and for collecting refuse (the rag-and-bone man). As Nigel Rothfels notes, the prohibition against dogs pulling carts in or near London caused most of the dogs to be killed by their owners as they went from being contributors to the family income to unaffordable expenses. Cart dogs were replaced by people with handcarts. About 150,000 dogs were killed or abandoned. Erica Fudge quotes Hilda Kean: 
The Protection of Animals Act 1911 extended the ban on draft dogs to the rest of the kingdom. As many as 600,000 dogs were killed or abandoned.

The Protection of Animals Act 1911 has since been largely superseded by the Animal Welfare Act 2006, which also superseded and consolidated more than 20 other pieces of legislation, including the Protection of Animals Act 1934 and the Abandonment of Animals Act 1960. The Act introduced the new welfare offence, which means that animal owners have a positive duty of care, and outlaws neglect to provide for their animals' basic needs, such as access to adequate nutrition and veterinary care.

Under the Criminal Damage Act 1971, domestic animals can be classed as property that is capable of being "damaged or destroyed". A charge of criminal damage may be appropriate for the injury or death of an animal owned by someone other than the defendant, and prosecution under the Animal Welfare Act 2006 may also be appropriate.

Oceania

Australia
In Australia, all states and territories have enacted legislation governing animal welfare. The legislation is:
Animal Welfare Act 1992 (ACT)
Prevention of Cruelty to Animals Act 1979 (NSW)
Animal Welfare Act (NT)
Animal Care and Protection Act 2001 (Qld)
Animal Welfare Act 1985 (SA)
Animal Welfare Act 1993 (Tas)
Prevention of Cruelty to Animals Act 1986 (Vic)
Animal Welfare Act 2002 (WA)

Welfare laws have been criticized as not adequately protecting animals. Whilst police maintain an overall jurisdiction in the prosecution of criminal matters, in many states officers of the RSPCA and other animal welfare charities are accorded authority to investigate and prosecute animal cruelty offenses.

New Zealand

The Animal Welfare Act 1999 protects animals from maltreatment.

See also
 Bear-baiting
 Crush fetish
 Goat throwing
 Cat-burning
 Pain in animals
 Society for the Prevention of Cruelty to Animals
 List of animal welfare organizations

References

Further reading
 Arluke, Arnold. Brute Force: Animal Police and the Challenge of Cruelty, Purdue University Press (15 August 2004), hardcover, 175 pages, . An ethnographic study of humane law enforcement officers.
 Fiber-Ostrow, Pamela, Lovell, Jarret S. "Behind a veil of secrecy: animal abuse, factory farms, and Ag-Gag legislation." Contemporary Justice Review (2016) 19(2), 230 – 249.
 Lea, Suzanne Goodney (2007). Delinquency and Animal Cruelty: Myths and Realities about Social Pathology, hardcover, 168 pages, . Lea challenges the argument made by animal rights activists that animal cruelty enacted during childhood is a precursor to human-directed violence.
 Munro H. The battered pet (1999) In F. Ascione & P. Arkow (Eds.) Child Abuse, Domestic Violence, and Animal Abuse. West Lafayette, IN: Purdue University Press, 199–208. 
 Tichelar, Michael. "Royalty and Opposition to Blood Sports in Twentieth‐Century Britain: From Imperial Spoils to Wildlife Conservation?." History 103.357 (2018): 588–609.
 Mance, Henry (2021). How to love animals : in a human-shaped world (First North American edition ed.). New York. . 

 
Animal welfare
Crimes
Animal law
Ethical schools and movements
Animal ethics
Articles containing video clips